James Rutherford (1894–1924) was an English professional footballer who played as a full back in the Football League for Brighton & Hove Albion.

Life and career
Rutherford was born in Bedlington, Northumberland, in 1894. He played for Ashington of the Northern Alliance before turning professional with Brighton & Hove Albion of the newly formed Football League Third Division. His older brother Jack was already on Brighton's books, and the pair played in the same team in 15 competitive matches. After losing his place to new signing Jack Feebery in 1921, Rutherford spent the 1921–22 season in the reserves and left the club in September 1922. He moved to the United States where he died in 1924.

References

1894 births
1924 deaths
People from Bedlington
Footballers from Northumberland
English footballers
Association football fullbacks
Ashington A.F.C. players
Brighton & Hove Albion F.C. players
English Football League players